Kiddle.co is a web search engine and online encyclopedia emphasizing safety for children. Kiddle search is powered by Google Programmable Search Engine and employs SafeSearch with additional filters. Kiddle is powered by Google Custom Search but is not affiliated with Google LLC. However, it has been mistaken for a Google product in several news articles and blogs due to the nature of its name.

History 
Kiddle's domain was registered in 2014. The .co domain was chosen by the designers in order to emphasize the search engine's "children only" target audience. Kiddle became very popular on social media in 2016, and even became a meme due to blocking of certain keywords for a short period of time.

Format 
Once the user enters topics in the search toolbar, Kiddle returns and ranks its findings, and pushes child-safe content higher in its search results.  It appears like a Google Programmable Search Engine window with an outer space stylized theme for their pages. Kiddle presents search results with the first three results being deemed safe and written specifically for kids and "checked by Kiddle editors", the next four being safe sites not written specially for kids, but presented in kid friendly language. The eighth result and anything else beyond are safe sites written for adults but harder to understand for kids. Results presented are filtered through Google SafeSearch. 

If the user enters terms that are considered inappropriate, a picture of a robot is displayed, telling the user to try again.

Kpedia 
Kiddle Encyclopedia (Kpedia) is an online encyclopedia available from their search engine. It lists over 700,000 articles, and is "based on selected content and facts from Wikipedia, rewritten for children." Kiddle positions its Kpedia as an educational resource to be used for "school homework help and general education," and includes their articles in search results. The software is powered by MediaWiki.

Controversy 
In 2016, Kiddle came under criticism for blocking various LGBT related search terms, with their rationale being that the keywords were not suitable for small children.

Due to public outcry, Kiddle announced they would unblock these keywords.

See also 
 KidRex
 KidzSearch
 Google

References

Further reading

External links 
 

Internet search engines